

Results

Men's junior cross-country